Gerald Kilota (born 2 January 1994) is a French professional footballer who plays as a defender for Belgian club Seraing.

Club career
Kilota joined Clermont Foot in 2012 from Caen. He made his Ligue 2 debut at 30 August 2013 against Créteil.

References

1994 births
Sportspeople from Saint-Denis, Seine-Saint-Denis
Living people
Association football defenders
French footballers
Stade Malherbe Caen players
Clermont Foot players
R.F.C. Seraing (1922) players
Championnat National 2 players
Championnat National 3 players
Ligue 2 players
Belgian Pro League players
Challenger Pro League players
French expatriate footballers
Expatriate footballers in Belgium
French expatriate sportspeople in Belgium
Footballers from Seine-Saint-Denis